The Our Lady of Sorrows Catholic Church of Rock Springs, Wyoming, on A at Broadway, was built in 1932.  It was designed by Boston architects Maginnis and Walsh and its construction was run by supervising architect James Libby.  Also known as South Side Catholic Church, it was listed on the National Register of Historic Places in 1997.
It was deemed significant for its association with European immigrants to Rock Springs, especially the Irish; the church had a Polish counterpart Catholic parish on the north side of Rock Springs.

References

External links
 Our Lady of Sorrows Catholic Church at the Wyoming State Historic Preservation Office

Roman Catholic Diocese of Cheyenne
Roman Catholic churches in Wyoming
Romanesque Revival architecture in Wyoming
Romanesque Revival church buildings in the United States
Roman Catholic churches completed in 1932
Buildings and structures in Rock Springs, Wyoming
Churches on the National Register of Historic Places in Wyoming
National Register of Historic Places in Sweetwater County, Wyoming
20th-century Roman Catholic church buildings in the United States